Viy (Spirit of Evil or Vii) is a 1967 Soviet horror film directed by Konstantin Yershov and Georgi Kropachyov. Based on the story of the same name by Nikolai Gogol, the film's screenplay was written by Yershov, Kropachyov and Aleksandr Ptushko. The film was distributed by Mosfilm, and was the first Soviet-era horror film to be officially released in the USSR.

Plot
As a class of seminary students are sent home for vacation, three of them get lost on the way in the middle of the night. One spots a farmhouse in the distance, and they ask the old woman at the gate to let them spend the night. She agrees, on the condition that they sleep in separate areas of the farm. As one of them, Khoma Brutus, lies down in the barn to sleep, the old woman comes to him and tries to seduce him, which he staunchly refuses. She puts him under a spell and makes him lie down so she can climb on his back. She then rides him around the countryside like a horse. Khoma suddenly finds that they are flying and realizes she is a witch. He demands that she put him back down and, as soon as they land, he grabs a stick and beats her violently. As she cries out that she's dying, he looks and sees she has turned into a beautiful young woman. Horrified, he runs back to his seminary, where he finds the Rector has sent for him. Khoma is told that a rich merchant has a daughter who is dying and needs prayers for her soul, and that she specifically asked for Khoma by name. He refuses to go, but the Rector threatens him with a public beating, so he relents and finds he is returning to the farm where he met the witch. The girl dies before he gets there, and to his horror, he realizes she is the witch, and that he is the cause of her death (but he tells no one). The girl's father promises him great reward if he will stand vigil and pray for her soul for the next three nights. If he does not, grave punishment is implied. After the funeral rites, Khoma is told of a huntsman who fell in love with the young girl, and how when she came into the stable and asked his help to get on her horse, he said he would like it more if she rode on his back, then took her on his back and ran off with her, reminding Khoma of his encounter (the men telling the tale suspect the girl was a witch). He is taken to the chapel where the girl's body lies and is locked in for the night.

As soon as Khoma walks in, several cats scurry across the floor at his feet. He lights every candle in the chapel for comfort, then begins to recite the prayers for the girl's soul. He pauses to sniff tobacco, and when he sneezes, the girl opens her eyes and climbs out of the coffin, blindly searching for him (apparently, she can hear but cannot see). He quickly draws a sacred circle of chalk around himself, and this acts as a barrier, the night passes with Khoma praying fervently and the girl trying to get to him. When the rooster crows in the morning, the girl returns to her coffin and all the candles blow out.

The men of the rich man's estate, who escort Khoma to and from the chapel, surround him and asked what happened that night, to which he replies, "Nothing much. Just some noises".

Khoma gets drunk to strengthen himself for the second night. This time, a flurry of birds fly out from the coffin, startling him into running for the door, which is shut by one of the rich man's men. Khoma returns to the prayer podium and is frightened by a bird flying out his prayer book. He draws the sacred circle again and begins the prayers. The whole covered coffin rises into the air and bangs against the protection of the sacred circle, causing a panicked Khoma to cry out to God to protect him. The cover falls off the coffin, and the girl sits up and again starts reaching blindly to him, but once more, she cannot see him or get to him. The coffin continues to fly around the room as the girl reaches blindly for Khoma and calls his name. As the rooster crows, the coffin returns to its place and the girl lies down, but her voice is heard placing a curse on Khoma, to turn his hair white and render him blind—however, his hair actually turns grey and he retains his sight. The rich man's men have to help him off the floor and out of the chapel, placing a hat on his head. When they return to the farm, Khoma demands music and begins dancing as a young boy plays on his flute. He removes his hat, and all the servants can see his hair is grey. He asks to speak to their master, saying he will explain what happened and that he doesn't want to pray in the chapel any more.

Khoma meets with the rich man, trying to explain what happened in the chapel and begging to be allowed to leave, but the rich man threatens him with a thousand lashes if he refuse, and a thousand pieces of gold if he succeeds. In spite of this, Khoma tries to escape, but makes a wrong turn and winds up in the hands of the rich man's men, and is returned to the farm.

He returns to the chapel a third time, drunk, but still remembers to draw the sacred circle before beginning the prayers. The girl sits up on the coffin and begins to curse him, causing him to have visions of walking skeletons and grasping, ghostly hands. She summons various hideous, demonic figures to torment him, but they cannot get past the sacred circle either. She finally calls on Viy, a name which causes all the demons to tremble in fear. A large monster emerges, and orders his huge eyelids to be moved from his eyes. Khoma realizes he cannot look this demon in the eye or he is lost. Viy is able to see Khoma, which allows the other demons to pounce on him and beat him, but when the rooster crows once more, the demons all flee away, leaving Khoma motionless on the floor. The girl turns back into the old woman and lies down in the coffin, which instantly falls apart. The Rector enters the chapel to this scene, and races off to tell the others.

The last scene shows Khoma's two friends from the start of the movie back at the seminary, painting some walls. One offers to drink to Khoma's memory, while the other doubts that Khoma is really dead.

The movie follows the original tale in a somewhat loose fashion, but manages to retain the majority of the images and action.

Cast
 Leonid Kuravlyov as Khoma Brutus
 Natalya Varley as Pannochka (voiced by Klara Rumyanova)
 Alexei Glazyrin as sotnik
 Vadim Zakharchenko as Khalyava
 Nikolai Kutuzov as witch
 Pyotr Vesklyarov as Dorosh
 Dmitri Kapka as Overko
 Stepan Shkurat as Yavtukh
 Georgy Sochevko as Stepan
 Nikolai Yakovchenko  as Spirid
 Nikolai Panasyev as comforter
 Boryslav Brondukov as bursak

Production

Some of the "witch" scenes and the ending where Viy appears were toned down due to technological limitations as well as then current restrictions on Soviet film production. The directors were able to avoid the previous restrictions by using what was considered a "folk tale".

Reception
Richard Gilliam of AllMovie gave the film four out of five stars, commending production design, pacing, and Kuravlyov's performance. In his book 1001 Movies You Must See Before You Die, Steven Jay Schneider refers to the film as "a colorful, entertaining, and genuinely frightening film of demons and witchcraft that boasts some remarkable special-effects work by Russia's master of cinematic fantasy, Aleksandr Ptushko." Anne Billson wrote in Sight & Sound declared that "Thanks to effects that transcend the limitations of their time, the uncanny occurrences of 'Viy' can still generate a frisson" and that "this exquisite presentation is a must-see for every aficionado of folk-horror and dark fairytales." Martin Unsworth of Starburst gave the film a five star rating, declaring that what "makes Viy so special isn’t so much the direction of Konstantin Ershov and Georgiy Kropachyov but the effects created by Aleksandr Ptushko alongside the cinematography of Viktor Pishchalnikov and Fyodor Provorov. There are terrifying moments early on that stand out, especially the transgressive scene involving the old witch (played by male actor Nikolai Kutuzov), which is the stuff of nightmares alone. The film gains its classic status, however, thanks to a bombardment of in-camera effects, jaunty camera angles, and a building sense of dread that explodes with an assault of strange, nightmarish characters."

Home media
The film was released on DVD on 21 August 2001 by Image Entertainment. It was re-released on DVD by Hanzibar Films on 28 March 2005. Severin Films released the film on Blu-ray in 2019.

Remake

A modern version starring Jason Flemyng was in production for several years and went through several different deadlines, but was released in 2014. The 1990 Serbian version of the film, called A Holy Place, ran on the Fantasia Festival 2010.

References

Sources

External links
 
 
 

1967 films
Soviet horror films
Russian fantasy films
1960s Russian-language films
1967 horror films
Mosfilm films
Russian supernatural horror films
Films based on Viy (story)
Films set in Ukraine
Films shot in Ukraine
Russian horror films
Folk horror films
Films based on Russian folklore
Films based on Slavic mythology
Films about witchcraft
Gothic horror films
Russian dark fantasy films